This is a list of German television related events from 2003.

Events
7 March - Lou is selected to represent Germany at the 2003 Eurovision Song Contest with her song "Let's Get Happy". She is selected to be the forty-eighth German Eurovision entry during Countdown Grand Prix held at the Ostseehalle in Kiel.
8 March - Alexander Klaws wins the first season of Deutschland sucht den Superstar.
17 March - Release date of Alexander Klaws' debut single, "Take Me Tonight".
7 July - Jan Geilhufe wins the fourth season of Big Brother Germany.

Debuts

Domestic
18 April - In der Mitte eines Lebens (2003) (ZDF)
17 September - Der Fürst und das Mädchen (2002–2007) (ZDF)

International
2 September -  Scrubs (2001–2010) (ProSieben)
29 September -  Caillou (1997–2010) (Super RTL)
 What About Mimi? (2000–2002) (KiKa)
 Malcolm in the Middle (2000-2006) (Unknown)

BFBS
 Boohbah (2003–2006)
 Yoko! Jakamoko! Toto! (2003–2005)

Television shows

1950s
Tagesschau (1952–present)

1960s
 heute (1963-present)

1970s
 heute-journal (1978-present)
 Tagesthemen (1978-present)

1980s
Wetten, dass..? (1981-2014)
Lindenstraße (1985–present)

1990s
Gute Zeiten, schlechte Zeiten (1992–present)
Marienhof (1992–2011)
Unter uns (1994-present)
Verbotene Liebe (1995-2015)
Schloss Einstein (1998–present)
In aller Freundschaft (1998–present)
Wer wird Millionär? (1999-present)

2000s
Big Brother Germany (2000-2011, 2015–present)
Deutschland sucht den Superstar (2002–present)

Ending this year

Births

Deaths

See also
2003 in Germany